Alucita tridentata is a moth of the family Alucitidae. It is found in France, Italy, Turkey and on Corsica and Sicily.

References

Moths described in 1994
Alucitidae
Moths of Europe
Moths of Asia